Mihkel Varrik (also Mihkel Warrik; 9 September 1879 Rannu Parish, Tartu County - 8 January 1967 Toronto) was an Estonian politician. He was a member of Estonian Constituent Assembly. On 6 October 1919, he resigned his position and he was replaced by Anna Tellman.

References

1879 births
1967 deaths
Members of the Estonian Constituent Assembly